USS Ranger was an armed schooner that served in the U.S. Navy from 1814 to 1816.

Ranger, probably a former privateer, was purchased in Baltimore, Maryland, in March 1814. She was used as a lookout vessel in Chesapeake Bay during the War of 1812. She was sold in Baltimore in 1816.

References

Age of Sail naval ships of the United States
War of 1812 ships of the United States
Schooners of the United States Navy
1814 ships